Wari Club Dhaka is an association football club from Dhaka, Bangladesh. It  currently competes in the Bangladesh Championship League (BCL). Wari Club is the second oldest football club of Bangladesh, established in 1898. The club's motto is One heart one mind.

History
In 1898, after the discontinuation of Wellington Club, a few of its sports-loving members decided to form the Wari Club. During the British rule in India, Rai Bahadur Surendranath Rai played a key role in forming the club. After gaining popularity, the club in 1930, found their playing field at Paltan ground in Dacca. The first success came in 1910 at Cooch Behar, when Wari defeated the British Kings' House club at a tournament.

In the prestigious IFA Shield tournament, they had moderate success till 1945. One of their most noteworthy achievements came in 1917, when they defeated defending champions Lincoln Club in Calcutta.

Since its establishment, the D.C. of Dhaka District became the clubs president without facing any competition. Wari Club gained popularity in 1978, as they defeated Dhaka Abahani in the Dhaka League. The team is currently competing in the Bangladesh Championship League.

Current squad
Wari Club Dhaka squad for 2022–23 season.

Other departments
The club also has cricket, hockey, volleyball, and table tennis departments. The hockey team also started to do well as it became Dhaka Hockey League runners-up in 1953 and then champions in 1964.

Success also followed the table tennis team, when Wari won the "Akhtar Memorial Table Tennis Tournament" in 1976 and 1977. Its volleyball team also achieved success as they became the dominant team in the 1970s and 80s, winning leagues on numerous occasions.

Team record

Head coach record

Personnel

Current technical staff

Honours
Nar Narayan Shield
Winners (1): 1948

See also
 List of football clubs in Bangladesh
 History of football in Bangladesh

Notes

References

Further reading

External links

Wari Club Dhaka at Global Sports Archive

Wari Club Dhaka at Elevensports
Wari Club Dhaka at Scorebing

Old Dhaka
Association football clubs established in 1898
Football clubs in Bangladesh
Sport in Bangladesh
19th-century establishments in India